Evaldo is a given name. It may refer to:

People
 Evaldo Gouveia (1928–2020), Brazilian singer-songwriter
 Evaldo Cabral de Mello (born 1936), Brazilian historian and diplomat
 Evaldo (footballer, born 1945), Evaldo Cruz, Brazilian football forward
 Evaldo da Silva (born 1958), Brazilian sprinter
 Evaldo Silva (born 1974), Brazilian football defender
 Evaldo Goncalves (born 1981), Brazilian football striker
 Evaldo (footballer, born 1982), Evaldo dos Santos Fabiano, Brazilian football left-back
 Evaldo (footballer, born 1983), Evaldo Silva dos Santos, Brazilian football centre-ack

Other uses
 Case Evaldo Rosa, homicide case in Guadalupe, Brazil\